Tri Yann is a French band from Nantes who play folk rock music drawing on traditional Breton folk ballads.

The band was founded in 1969 by Jean Chocun, Jean-Paul Corbineau and Jean-Louis Jossic – all of whom remained members – hence the suggested name of Tri Yann an Naoned (Breton for "Three Johns of Nantes"), Jean and Yann being respectively the French and Breton versions of the name John.  They presented their final concerts in September 2021, a celebration of their 50th anniversary as a group, which was delayed by the worldwide corona virus pandemic. In December 2022, co-founder Jean-Paul Corbineau died following a long struggle with leukemia.

As the best known "Celtic" band in France, Tri Yann are one of the longest-standing Breton music groups surviving from the folk rock revival of the 1970s (following the revival of the bagadoù and Alan Stivell's work). The group are famous for the outlandish costumes worn on stage.

Among their best-known songs are La Jument de Michao (including the chorus "J'entends le loup, le renard et la belette" i.e. "I hear the wolf, the fox and the weasel") and Dans les prisons de Nantes ("In the prisons of Nantes"). Live performances usually include the Breton national anthem Bro Gozh ma Zadoù ("The Land of My Fathers") which has the same tune to the Welsh National Anthem.

Tri Yann sang the role of Uther Pendragon in Alan Simon's rock opera Excalibur, as well as Louis XII of France in Simon's rock opera Anne de Bretagne.

Members
Founding members
 Jean-Louis Jossic (vocals, bombarde)
 Jean Chocun (vocals, mandolin, guitar)
 Jean-Paul Corbineau (vocals, acoustic guitar)

Other present members
 Gérard Goron (vocals, drums) 1977–
 Jean-Luc Chevalier (electric guitar, bass guitar) 1988–
 Konan Mevel (bagpipes, flutes) 1999–
 Fred Bourgeois (vocals, keyboards) 1999–
 Christophe Peloil (vocals, violin) 1999–

Former members
 Bernard Baudriller (bass guitar) 1971–1985
 Jérôme Gasmi (drums) 1976–1977
 Christophe Le Helley (flute, medieval instruments, keyboard) 1992–1998
 Christian Vignoles (guitars) 1979–1988
 Bruno Sabathé (keyboard) 1985–1992
 Louis-Marie Séveno (violin, bass guitar) 1986–1999
 Mylène Coue (vocals) 1978
 Bleunwenn Mevel (vocals) 2000–2001

Discography 

 1972: Tri Yann an Naoned
 1973: Dix ans, Dix filles
 1974: Suite Gallaise
 1976: La Découverte ou l'Ignorance
 1978: Urba
 1981: An Héol a zo Glaz / Le Soleil est Vert
 1983: Café du Bon Coin
 1985: Anniverscène (live)
 1986: Master Série (compilation)
 1988: Le Vaisseau de Pierre
 1990: Belle et Rebelle
 1993: Inventaire 70/93 (compilation)
 1995: Inventaire Vol.2 (compilation)
 1995: Portraits
 1996: Tri Yann en Concert (Live)
 1997: La Veillée du 3ième Millénaire (interview)
 1998: Trilogie (3CD Compilation)
 1998: La Tradition Symphonique (live with the Orchestre National des Pays de la Loire)
 1999: L'Essentiel en Concert (live compilation)
 2001: Le Pélégrin
 2001: 30 ans au Zénith (live CD & DVD)
 2003: Marines
 2004: La Tradition Symphonique 2 (live with the Orchestre National des Pays de la Loire)
 2004: Les Racines du Futur (CD & DVD compilation)
 2006: Talents (compilation)
 2006: Gold (2CD compilation)
 2007: Abysses
 2011: Rummadoù (Générations)
 2012: Chansons De Marins
 2012: Le concert des 40 ans (live CD & DVD)
 2016: La Belle enchantée

External links
 Tri Yann official web site 
 
 

Tri Yann
Breton-language singers
French-language singers
English-language singers from France
French folk music groups
Medieval folk rock groups
Celtic music groups
Musical groups established in 1969
1969 establishments in France